James Mackay (1718–1785) was a captain in the British Army during the French and Indian War.  He was in command of an Independent Company of South Carolina when he was sent by the Governor of South Carolina to assist Virginia's defense of the Ohio Country from the French in the summer of 1754.  He was co-commander of Fort Necessity along with George Washington during the Battle of the Great Meadows on 3 July 1754.

References
 Chronology of the Battle of the Great Meadows

British America army officers
1718 births
1785 deaths